The Caerphilly by-election of 15 July 1968 was held after the death of Labour MP Ness Edwards.

The seat was very safe, having been won by Labour at the 1966 United Kingdom general election by over 21,000 votes but Plaid Cymru gave Labour a serious fright in this by-election and came close to winning the seat on a huge swing.

Candidates
Labour chose Alfred Evans to defend their seat, who was a councillor.
Nationalist party Plaid Cymru stood Philip Williams, who at the time was teaching at University College, Aberystwyth and was mentored by John DA Howell.
The Conservatives chose Robert Williams.
Peter Sadler was the choice of the Liberal Party association.

Result of the previous general election

Result of the by-election

References

1968 elections in the United Kingdom
1968 in Wales
1960s elections in Wales
By-election, 1968
By-elections to the Parliament of the United Kingdom in Welsh constituencies